Events from the year 1944 in France.

Incumbents
Chairman of the Provisional Government: Philippe Pétain (until 20 August), Charles de Gaulle (starting 20 August)
Vice-President of the Council of Ministers: Pierre Laval (until 20 August), Charles de Gaulle (starting 20 August)

Events
15 March – The National Council of the French Resistance approves the Resistance programme.
1 June – BBC transmits coded messages (including the first line of a poem by Paul Verlaine) to underground resistance fighters in France warning that the invasion of Europe is imminent.
2 June – The provisional French government is established.
5 June
More than 1000 British bombers drop 5000 tons of bombs on German gun batteries on the Normandy coast in preparation for D-Day.
At 10:15 p.m. local time, the BBC transmits coded messages including the second line of the Paul Verlaine poem to the underground resistance indicating that the invasion of Europe is about to begin.
6 June
Battle of Normandy begins – Operation Overlord, code named D-Day, commences with the landing of 155,000 Allied troops on the beaches of Normandy.
Battle of Cherbourg begins.
7 June – Bayeux liberated by British troops.
9 June – Over 200 people are killed by 2nd SS Panzer Division ("Das Reich") in the Tulle massacre
10 June
642 people are killed by 2nd SS Panzer Division ("Das Reich") in the Oradour-sur-Glane massacre.
Battle of Carentan begins.
13 June – Battle of Bloody Gulch, near Carentan, United States forces victory.
14 June – Battle of Carentan ends with Allied victory.
26 June – American troops enter Cherbourg.
30 June – Battle of Cherbourg ends with the fall of the strategically valuable port to American forces.
9 July – British and Canadian forces capture Caen.
9 August – Ordonnance du 9 août 1944 relative au rétablissement de la légalité républicaine sur le territoire continental declares the Constitutional Law of 1940 issued by the Provisional Government void ab initio. 
12 August – The world's first undersea oil pipeline is laid, between England and France in Operation Pluto.
15 August – Operation Dragoon lands Allies in southern France.
19 August – Liberation of Paris: The city rises against German occupation with the help of Allied troops.
20 August – American forces defeat German forces at Chambois. This victory closed the Falaise Gap.
24 August – Liberation of Paris: The Allies enter Paris, successfully completing Operation Overlord.
25 August
German surrender of Paris: General Dietrich von Choltitz surrenders Paris to the Allies, in defiance of Hitler's orders to destroy it.
Maillé massacre: 129 civilians (70% women and children) are massacred by the Gestapo at Maillé, Indre-et-Loire.
The Red Ball Express convoy system begins operation, supplying tons of materiel to Allied forces in France.
26 August
Toulon liberated in Battle of Toulon (1944).
Ordonnance instituting Indignité nationale.
28 August – Marseille liberated in Battle of Marseille. 
8 September – Menton is liberated from Germany.
11 September – Northern and Southern France invasion forces link up near Dijon.
24 September – The U.S. Army 45th Infantry Division takes the strongly defended city of Epinal before crossing the Moselle River and entering the western foothills of the Vosges.
5 October – Royal Canadian Air Force pilots shoot down the first German jet fighter over France.
31 October – Mass murderer Marcel Petiot is apprehended in a Paris Métro station.
23 November – Liberation of Strasbourg.
19 December – Newspaper Le Monde first published in Paris.
Toymaker Jouef established.

Arts and literature
6 February – Première of Jean Anouilh's tragedy Antigone, at the Théâtre de l'Atelier in Nazi-occupied Paris.
May – Première of Jean-Paul Sartre's existentialist drama Huis Clos, at the Théâtre du Vieux-Colombier in Nazi-occupied Paris.

Births

January to June
17 January – Françoise Hardy, singer.
10 February – Jean-Daniel Cadinot, film director and producer (died 2008)
25 February – François Cevert, motor racing driver (died 1973)
7 April – Jean-Pierre Brucato, soccer player (died 1998)
22 May – Henri Guédon, percussionist (died 2006)
25 May – Pierre Bachelet, singer songwriter (died 2005)
26 May – Laurent-Michel Vacher, philosopher, writer and journalist (died 2005)
22 June
 Pierre Goldman, left-wing intellectual, convicted of several robberies and assassinated (died 1979)
 Gérard Mourou, electrical engineer, recipient of the Nobel Prize in Physics
24 June – Ticky Holgado, actor (died 2004)

July to December
12 July – Jean-François Jenny-Clark, double bass player (died 1998)
9 August – Patrick Depailler, motor racing driver (died 1980)
14 August – Jean-François Bizot, journalist and writer (died 2007)
2 September – Gilles Marchal, songwriter and singer (died 2013)
6 September – Christian Boltanski, photographer, sculptor and installation artist (died 2021)

Full date unknown
Jean-Jacques Le Chenadec, urban violence victim (died 2005)

Deaths
14 January – Eugène Louis Bouvier, entomologist and carcinologist (born 1856)
31 January – Jean Giraudoux, novelist, essayist, diplomat and playwright (born 1882)
4 February – Yvette Guilbert, singer and actress (born 1865)
24 February – Fanny Clar, journalist and writer (born 1875)
5 March – Max Jacob, poet, painter, writer and critic (born 1876)
22 March – Pierre Brossolette, journalist and Resistance fighter (born 1903)
30 April – Paul Poiret, fashion designer (born 1879)
20 May – Fraser Barron, New Zealand bomber pilot at Le Mans (born 1921 in Dunedin)
6 July – Andrée Borrel, French World War II heroine (executed) (born 1919)
6 July – Sonia Olschanezky, German-born French Jewish World War II heroine (executed) (born 1923)
7 July – Georges Mandel, politician and Resistance leader (executed) (born 1885)
31 July – Antoine de Saint-Exupéry, pilot and writer (born 1900)
9 September – Robert Benoist, motor racing driver and war hero (executed) (born 1895)
11 September – Yolande Beekman, World War II heroine (executed) (born 1911)
13 September – Madeleine Damerment, World War II heroine (executed) (born 1917)
1 November – Lucien Cayeux, sedimentary petrographer (born 1864)
5 November – Alexis Carrel, surgeon and biologist, recipient of the Nobel Prize in Physiology or Medicine (born 1873)
13 December- Wassily Kandinsky, artist (born 1866)
30 December – Romain Rolland, writer, Nobel Prize in Literature (born 1866)

See also
 List of French films of 1944

References

1940s in France